Mitali Bose Perkins is an Indian American writer of children's and young adult literature.

Early life 
Mitali was born in Kolkata, India and moved to the United States when she was seven. As a child she lived in India, Ghana, Cameroon, London, New York City, and Mexico City.

Education 
Mitali Perkins earned a BA in Political Science at Stanford University and a Masters of Public Policy at UC Berkley.

Career 
Perkins has taught middle school, high school, and college students. Perkins was an Adjunct Associate Professor at Saint Mary’s College of California. A film based on Perkins book, Rickshaw Girl, was produced in 2021. It was directed by Amitabh Reza Chowdhury.

Published works 

Rickshaw Girl (2007)
Bamboo People (2010)
You Bring the Distant Near (2017)
Forward Me Back to You (2019)
Between Us and Abuela (2019)

Awards and recognition 

2008 Jane Addams Children's Book Award for Rickshaw Girl
 2011 YALSA Top Ten Best Fiction for Young Adults for Bamboo People
 2016 South Asia Book Award for Tiger Boy.
 2017 National Book Award Young People's Literature Longlist for You Bring the Distant Near
 2018 Walter Honor Book, Teen Category for You Bring the Distant Near
 2020 Rise, A Feminist Book Project recommended book, Forward Me Back to You
 2020 Américas Award for Children’s and Young Adult Literature for Between Us and Abuela

References

External links 
 Official website

Writers from Kolkata
Stanford University alumni
University of California, Berkeley alumni
Saint Mary's College of California faculty
American writers of young adult literature
American women children's writers
Indian emigrants to the United States
21st-century American writers
21st-century American women writers